The discography of American country singer Johnny Rodriguez contains studio albums, compilation albums, singles and music videos.

Albums

AGypsy peaked at No. 18 on the RPM Country Albums chart in Canada.

Singles

Guest singles

Music videos

Notes

References

Country music discographies
Discographies of American artists